Kelvin Anderson (born February 4, 1972) is a former professional gridiron football player. As a running back, he rushed for over 1,000 yards in eight consecutive seasons in the Canadian Football League, a league record. He won the CFL's Grey Cup championship twice, as a member of the Calgary Stampeders, in 1998 and 2001.

Anderson played football at New Madrid County Central High School. He played college football at Southeast Missouri State where he earned the nickname "Earthquake". Anderson's eight consecutive 1,000 yard seasons began in 1996 with the Calgary Stampeders. In 2000, he played in 15 games for Calgary, and ran for 1,048 yards and scored six touchdowns. He caught 34 passes for 283 yards and two touchdowns, and captured the Eddie James Memorial Trophy as the Western Division's top rusher. In 2001 he was named a Western All-Star for the fifth consecutive season, and was named a CFL All-Star for the third time in his career, and ran for a career-high 1,383 yards and six touchdowns. Anderson also caught 48 passes for 433 yards and nine touchdowns. Anderson also played in the only XFL season in 2001 for the San Francisco Demons, leading the team in rushing with 228 yards.

Anderson had played all of his CFL career with the Calgary Stampeders when he was released by them prior to the 2003 season in favor of Lawrence Phillips. Anderson signed with the BC Lions, following head coach and general manager Wally Buono who had also been let go by Calgary. With the Lions in 2003, he rushed for over 1,000 yards for the eighth consecutive season, setting a league record. He retired just prior the 2004 CFL season.  Antonio Warren succeeded him as the Lions' starting running back.

Anderson was inducted to the Canadian Football Hall of Fame in 2017.

Career regular season rushing statistics

References

1972 births
Living people
African-American players of Canadian football
American football running backs
BC Lions players
Calgary Stampeders players
Canadian Football League Rookie of the Year Award winners
Canadian football running backs
Southeast Missouri State Redhawks football players
San Francisco Demons players
Canadian Football Hall of Fame inductees
21st-century African-American sportspeople
20th-century African-American sportspeople
Players of American football from South Bend, Indiana